Framing Youth is a 1937 Our Gang short comedy film directed by Gordon Douglas. It was the 158th Our Gang short (159th film, 70th talking short, and 71st talking film) that was released.

Cast

The Gang
 Carl Switzer as Alfalfa
 Billie Thomas as Buckwheat
 Darla Hood as Darla
 Eugene Lee as Porky
 George McFarland as Spanky
 Gary Jasgur as Junior

Additional cast
 Tommy Bond as Butch
 Ernie Alexander as Usher
 Jack Mulhall as Radio Announcer
 Olive Brasno as Singing voice over (voice)
 The Meglin Kiddies as Singing voice overs (voice)
 John Collum as Audience extra
 Harold Switzer as Extra

Review 
"'Framing Youth' is a [sic] short and sweet. Despite its brief running time, there is introductory material, exposition, a crisis, a climax, and an ideal conclusion. Everything clicks."

See also
 List of American films of 1937
 Our Gang filmography

References

External links

1937 films
1937 comedy films
1937 short films
American black-and-white films
Films directed by Gordon Douglas
Metro-Goldwyn-Mayer short films
Our Gang films
1930s American films